Welcome 2 Club XIII  is the fourteenth studio album by southern rock band Drive-By Truckers released on June 3, 2022. The album's title references one of the venues where the band first played near Muscle Shoals, Alabama. The autobiographical nature of the album's lyrics presents a welcomed return to form in contrast to the more politically charged songs from the band's previous albums. It features vocal contributions from Schaefer Llana, Mike Mills (from R.E.M.), and Margo Price.

Reception
The album received a score of 78 from Metacritic, indicating generally positive reviews. American Songwriter gave the album 3.5 out of 5 stars and wrote that "while Welcome 2 Club XIII has been described by the band itself as autobiographical in nature, it still manages to retain the populist appeal that drove those earlier efforts." John Amen of Beats Per Minute wrote that Welcome 2 Club XIII shows the Drive-By Truckers "temporarily setting aside their polemical blowtorches, instead mindfully venturing into vivid inventories of their own lives, choices, and karmic trajectories." He added, "Club XIII perhaps marks the end of an era, for DBT and the broader culture, suggesting that our outward-moving attention, while politically and socially significant, has to yield at some point to self-assessment." Other reviews from AllMusic, Glide Magazine, and PopMatters praised the album's raw sound and autobiographical lyrics while noting it lacks the direct political commentary of their previous three records.

Track listing

Personnel
Patterson Hood – vocals, guitar, mandocello
Mike Cooley – vocals, guitar
Brad Morgan – drums
Jay Gonzalez – keyboards, guitars and vocals
Matt Patton – bass, bass 6 and vocals
Margo Price - vocals on "Forged in Hell and Heaven Sent"

References 

Drive-By Truckers albums
ATO Records albums
2022 albums